David John Byrom (born 6 January 1965) was an English professional footballer who played as a full back in the Football League for Blackburn Rovers and Stockport County. He is the great-grandson of former Blackburn Rovers player Robert Byrom.

References

Living people
1965 births
People from Padiham
English footballers
Association football fullbacks
English Football League players
Blackburn Rovers F.C. players
Stockport County F.C. players